Bartsch is a German surname. Notable people with the surname include:

 Adam Bartsch (1757–1821), German scholar of old master prints and artist
 Dietmar Bartsch (born 1958), German politician (Die Linke)
 Jacob Bartsch (1600–1633), German astronomer
 Johann Bartsch, botanist
 Jürgen Bartsch (1946–1976), German serial killer
 Karl Bartsch (1832–1888), German medievalist and philologist
 Nik Bärtsch (born 1971), Swiss pianist, composer and producer
 Paul Bartsch (1871–1960), German-American biologist, zoologist and malacologist
 Renate Bartsch (born 1939), German philosopher of language
 Richard Bartsch (born 1959), German politician
 Rudolf Hans Bartsch (1873–1952), Austrian writer
 Subaru Kimura (born 1990), Japanese voice actor, born Subaru Samuel Bartsch 
 Susanne Bartsch (born 1968), German writer

See also 
 Bartsch's Squid
 Bartsch's law

German-language surnames
Surnames from given names

de:Bartsch